Reynaldo "Rey" Bautista (born June 19, 1986 in Candijay, Bohol, Philippines), more commonly known as Boom Boom Bautista, is a retired Filipino professional boxer who once fought for the WBO junior featherweight title. He currently resides in Tagbilaran City, Bohol.

Early life 
Bautista spent his early childhood in the fields, growing rice with his family. Craving to live a better and more successful life, he turned to boxing at a very young age. Bautista, at the time, was discovered by Nemi Monton (ABAP Region VII president and chair for Boxing Development of the Bohol PSC), who allowed the young Bautista to fight in amateur bouts, within the island province of Bohol. Fed up with poverty, Bautista turned pro just a week shy before his 17th birthday, hoping to find a better opportunity.

Early career at Bantamweight
On June 12, 2003, in the Gaisano Country Mall in Cebu, Philippines, Bautista made his professional debut. He won a shutout, unanimous decision (UD) through six rounds against Reyco Compendio. At only 17 years of age, Bautista showed much potential.

After winning his next seven fights, Bautista compiled an undefeated record of eight wins, and 0 losses (8-0). With only eight fights under his belt, the young Bautista campaigned in Indonesia, South Korea, and Japan for his next three fights. Impressively, he won all three bouts. Bautista defeated Indonesian, Hengky Wuwungan when the referee stopped the fight to prevent Wuwungan from receiving any further damage. Bautista then faced South Korean, Hwi-Jong Kim, whom he defeated by a split decision (SD) through ten rounds. Then Bautista followed that up by traveling to Japan to defeat Hirokatsu Yamazaki, when the Japanese retired from the bout right after the third round.

Following the Yamazaki fight, Bautista had the opportunity to fight for his first regional title. On August 17, 2004, in the Sports and Cultural Complex in Mandaue City, Cebu, Bautista defeated Thai fighter, Saensak Singmanasak by second-round TKO for the then vacant WBO Asia Pacific bantamweight title. Bautista defended that title once (against South African Vuyisile Bebe, whom he defeated by a UD through twelve rounds) before he got his first big break in the sport, a chance to show many others his true potential.

Super Bantamweight
On September 10, 2005, in the Staples Center in Los Angeles, Bautista fought in the undercard of Manny Pacquiao's and Erik Morales' respective fights with both Héctor Velázquez and Zahir Raheem. The then undefeated Bautista was able to defeat his Colombian opponent (Felix Flores) by a third-round KO, impressing many people, which led to him fighting on U.S. soil for the majority of his next few fights. But before he was able to make his three fight campaign in the United States, Bautista needed to defend his WBO Asia Pacific bantamweight title from Tanzanian, Obote Ameme. Bautista was able to do just that, defeating Ameme by a second-round TKO.

Three months later, Bautista started that three fight campaign by defeating Mexican, Gerardo Espinoza by a UD through eight rounds. Five months later, Bautista continued his success in the states by defeating Nicaraguan, Roberto Bonilla by KO in just three rounds. He finished off the successful "road-trip" by defeating Brazilian, Giovanni Andrade, after Andrade retired from the bout after 4 rounds of action.

After one fight in the Philippines (where he defeated Mexican, Marino Montiel for the then vacant WBO Inter-Continental and Asia Pacific Youth super bantamweight titles), Bautista fought in The World Awaits undercard, when his promoter at the time, Oscar De La Hoya of Golden Boy Promotions, allowed Bautista to fight in the undercard of his bout against Floyd Mayweather. This was a big step in Bautista's career, since the fight was titled as a WBO Super Bantamweight Title Eliminator.

On May 5, 2007, in the MGM Grand Garden Arena in Las Vegas, Nevada, Bautista faced and defeated the then undefeated Argentine contender Sergio Manuel Medina (28-0) by UD. Bautista, although defeating Medina, too suffered a knockdown. On the eleventh round, "Medina clearly staggered Bautista with a solid combination and the Filipino held on to the ropes to apparently keep himself from going down". But nonetheless, "in the end, it was the unabated aggression of Bautista which accounted for the big margins on the scorecards of the judges, as he connected with several solid combinations to win most of the close rounds (of the bout)". The win gives Bautista his first world title shot, against the then WBO Super Bantamweight World Champion, Daniel Ponce de León of Mexico.

First and second career loss
On August 11, 2007, in ARCO Arena in Sacramento, California, Bautista headlined the boxing World Cup staged by Golden Boy Promotions: Philippines vs. Mexico. Bautista, to the disappointment of the many Filipino fans in attendance that night, failed in his first attempt at a world title, when he suffered a first-round TKO loss to the hands of Daniel Ponce de León, suffering his first ever loss as a pro. The Mexican proved to be too strong, knocking down Bautista twice in the first round, forcing the referee to stop the bout.

Bautista lost by scores of 80-70, 78-72 and 77-73, all in favor of the Mexican.

Featherweight
Bautista and his handlers decided to move up one weight division, up to featherweight,. On October 16, 2009, Bautista made his long-awaited ring return. There, he took on respected Marangin Marbun of Indonesia, whom he defeated by a seventh-round TKO, awarding Bautista the then vacant interim WBC International Featherweight title, which he relinquished on January 19, 2010.

Bautista fought Thailand's Saichon Sotornpitak for a 10-round non titled fight on April 24, 2010 in Dubai. The bout headlined the card "Philippines vs The Rest of the World, which is presented by KO Promotions in association with ALA Promotions. In this event, two other Filipino boxers, Milan Melindo and Larry Canillas, won their respective bout. Bautista stopped Sotornpitak in the sixth round and improved his record to 28-2, with 21 knockouts. On August 28, 2010, Bautista fought Mexico's Alejandro Barrera (cousin of Marco Antonio Barrera) at the Waterfront Cebu City Hotel in Cebu. The Filipino pugilist won the match by TKO in the 4th round, after the referee stopped the fight due to a bad cut over Barrera's left eye, caused by a punch.

On January 29, 2011, the Filipino boxer knocked out Barrera in the third round of their rematch, which took place at the Cebu City Waterfront Hotel & Casino in Cebu, Philippines.

Ruiz-Bautista Rematch
June 12, 2011, after suffering a loss in 2008, Bautista defeated Ruiz by Technical decision.

Rey 'Boom Boom' Bautista suffered three cuts due to head butts before the fight was stopped at 0:56 of the seventh round. Heriberto 'Cuate' Ruiz of Mexico effectively defused Bautista's aggressiveness with timely clinches, an effective jab and lateral movement in the early rounds.

Just like in their first fight, Bautista was cut by a clash of heads in the third at the corner of his right eyebrow. Bautista continued to charge forward which resulted in heated exchanges. In the fifth, Ruiz' survival skills showed as he landed a low blow and effectively clinched. Another headbutt opened a cut on Bautista's scalp. Referee Danrex Tapdasan had a hard time controlling the extra-curricular activities.

Bautista was surging and landed the cleaner and harder blows in the 5th and 6th rounds. Ruiz was fading but another clash of heads opened a cut on Bautista's right eyebrow. The ring physician, Dr. Jose Unabia, recommended the fight stoppage. The scores read – Judge Bruce McTavish 69-65, Judge Muhamad Rois 68-65 and Judge Rey Danseco 68-65 all for Bautista.

Bautista won the IBF International featherweight title but a section of the crowd voiced their displeasure. The sportswriters at ringside also had an animated discussion about the outcome.

Per IBF rules, no points were deducted due to the headbutts.

WBO International featherweight title 
On October 20 Bautista won against Daniel Ruiz for the vacant WBO International featherweight title via split decision. The fight took place at the Mall of Asia Arena and was headlined by Bautista's ALA teammate AJ Banal.

Retirement 
Bautista attempted to defend the WBO International featherweight championship against José Ramírez on April 20, 2013 but lost by split decision. Moments after the bout, he announced his retirement,
but he returned for 2 more fights during 2014.

Post-boxing 
Several days after his retirement, Bautista applied to become a boxing trainer for newcomers in the Philippine Air Force.

Professional boxing record

References

External links 
 

|-

1986 births
Featherweight boxers
Super-bantamweight boxers
Bantamweight boxers
Living people
Boxers from Bohol
Filipino male boxers